Ardstraw (from  (hill or height of the holm or strath)) is a small village, townland and civil parish in County Tyrone, Northern Ireland, three miles northwest of Newtownstewart. In the 2001 Census it had a population of 222 people (81 houses).

Bishopric
The Diocese of Ardstraw was founded in the 6th century by Saint Eoghan. It is one of the dioceses recognized by the Synod of Ráth Breasail in 1111. Although the 1152 Synod of Kells replaced it in its list of dioceses with that of Maghera, the seat of which was later moved to Derry, bishops of Ardstraw continued to exist until the early 13th century, when the see was finally united to that of Derry.

No longer a residential bishopric it is today listed by the Catholic Church as a titular see.

John de Courcy
In 1198, John de Courcy, a Norman knight who had invaded Ulster in 1177, destroyed the church of Ardstraw on his way to Inishowen.

Ardstraw townland
The townland is situated in the historic barony of Strabane Lower and the civil parish of Ardstraw and covers an area of 353 acres.

The population of the townland declined during the 19th century:

Sport
Ardstraw F.C. plays association football in the Northern Ireland Intermediate League.

Civil parish of Ardstraw
The parish is largely situated in the historic barony of Strabane Lower and partly in Omagh West.

The parish contains the following towns and villages:
Ardstraw
Newtownstewart
Spamount
Victoria Bridge

Townlands
The parish contains the following townlands:
Aghafad, Aghasessy, Altdoghal, Archill, Ardbarren Lower, Ardbarren Upper, Ardstraw
Backhill, Ballought, Ballyfolliard, Ballymullarty, Ballynaloan, Ballyrenan, Barons Court, Beagh, Binnawooda, Birnaghs, Bloomry, Bolaght, Breen, Brocklis, Bunderg, Byturn
Carnaveagh, Carncorran Glebe, Carnkenny, Carrickadartan, Cashty, Castlebane, Cavandarragh, Clady Blair, Clady Haliday, Clady Hood, Clady Johnston, Clady-sproul	(also known as Liscreevaghan), Clare Upper, Claremore, County Tyrone, Cloghogle (also known as	Glenknock), Cloonty, Concess, Coolaghy, Coolcreaghy, Coolnacrunaght, Coolnaherin Park, Creevy, County Tyrone, Crew Lower, Crew Upper, Crosh, County Tyrone, Croshballinree
Deer Park Lower (also known as Deer Park Old), Deer Park Middle, Deer Park Upper (also known as	Deer Park New), Derrygoon, Douglas (also known as Ligfordrum), Drumclamph, Drumlegagh, Drumnabey, Drumnahoe, Dunrevan, Dunteige
Envagh, Erganagh
Fyfin
Gallan Lower, Gallan Upper, Garvetagh Lower, Garvetagh Upper, Glasmullagh, Glenglush, Glenknock (also known as Cloghogle), Golan Adams, Golan Hunter, Golan Sproul, Grange
Killeen, Killydart, Killymore, Kilreal Lower, Kilreal Upper, Kilstrule, Knockbrack, Knockiniller, Knockroe
Laragh, Largybeg, Legland, Legnabraid, Letterbin, Lettercarn, Ligfordrum (also known as Douglas), Liscreevaghan (also known as Clady-sproul), Lislafferty, Lisleen, Lisnacreaght, Lisnafin, Lisnatunny Glebe, Listymore, Lurganboy
Magheracoltan, Magheracreggan, Magheralough, Meaghy, Milltown, Moyle Glebe, Mullagh, Mulvin
Newtownstewart
Priestsessagh, Pubble
Rakelly, Ratyn
Scarvagherin, Sessagh of Gallan, Shanog, Shanonny East, Shanonny West, Skinboy, Skinboy Mountain, Spamount, Stonewalls, Stonyfalls, Strahulter, Straletterdallan, 
Tamnagh, Tievenny, Tirmegan, Tullymuck
Upperthird, Urbalreagh
Whitehouse

See also 
Robert McBride (1811-1895)
List of townlands of County Tyrone

References 

Villages in County Tyrone
Townlands of County Tyrone
 
Catholic titular sees in Europe